Shams C. Inati is a professor in the Department of Theology and Religious Studies, the Center for Arab and Islamic Studies, and the Department of Philosophy at Villanova University. She has authored many works and has translated numerous Arabic philosophical texts, with an emphasis on Ibn Sina and other medieval Islamic thinkers. Much of her work focuses on the problem of evil, metaphysics, and historical dilemmas in the Middle East. The Bulletin of the School of Oriental and African Studies praised her "scholarly, well researched and well analysed commentary" on Ibn Sina. Her work has also been cited or reviewed in the Middle East Journal, The Journal of Religion, the American Catholic Philosophical Quarterly, and the Journal of Semitic Studies.

Selected works

References

External links 

Villanova Faculty Page

Living people
Year of birth missing (living people)